The Ardent was an automobile produced by Caron et Cie, in Paris, from 1900 to 1901. The company used its own make of 5 hp v-twin engine in their four-seater vis-à-vis light car. Termed a "victoriette", it was unusual in that the body was mounted on a frame, but the engine was in front of the frame, unsuspended.

References 
 George Nick Georgano: The Beaulieu Encyclopedia of the Automobile. Volume 1: A–F. Fitzroy Dearborn Publishers, Chicago 2001, .
 George Nick Georgano: Autos. Encyclopédie complète. 1885 à nos jours. Courtille, Paris 1975. (French)

Vintage vehicles
Defunct motor vehicle manufacturers of France
Manufacturing companies based in Paris